Samuel L. Gee (January 2, 1928 – June 28, 1969) was an American Negro league shortstop in the 1940s.

A native of Detroit, Michigan, Gee attended Sidney D. Miller Middle School where he was an all-state performer in basketball, as well as a standout in football and baseball. He played for the New York Cubans in 1948, and went on to play minor league baseball into the 1950s. Gee also played basketball for the Harlem Globetrotters. He died in Windsor, Ontario in 1969 at age 41.

References

External links
 and Baseball-Reference Black Baseball Stats and Seamheads

1928 births
1969 deaths
New York Cubans players
Baseball shortstops
Baseball players from Detroit
Trois-Rivières Royals players
Olean Oilers players
Grand Rapids Jets players
Sioux Falls Canaries players
Harlem Globetrotters players
20th-century African-American sportspeople